Yekimovo is a rural locality (a village) in Voskresenskoye Rural Settlement, Cherepovetsky District, Vologda Oblast, Russia. The population was 15 as of 2002.

Geography 
Yekimovo is located 44 km north of Cherepovets (the district's administrative centre) by road. Petryayevo is the nearest rural locality.

References 

Rural localities in Cherepovetsky District